Luffia ferchaultella is a moth of the Psychidae family. It is found in Ireland, the United Kingdom, Belgium, the Netherlands, Luxembourg, France, Spain, Portugal, Switzerland, Germany and Italy.

Luffia ferchaultella might be the same species as Luffia lapidella.

External links
UKmoths

Psychidae
Moths of Europe
Moths described in 1850